Cape Tisan is a headland on the Mediterranean Sea coast of Mersin Province, Turkey. Τhe name is a distorted form of Ἀφροδισιᾶν (Aphrodisian; as many ancient names of places in Turkish from the accusative of the Greek name Ἀφροδίσιας).

Geography 
The cape is near to Yeşilovacık town in Silifke district of Mersin Province.

The cape and the surrounding 
The cape is actually the southernmost point of a circular spit of roughly  diameter connected to the mainland by an isthmus. The spit is famous for being home to Aphrodisias of Cilicia and the istmus has a pair of bays one in each side. In the Middle Ages the east bay was named Limni Aphrodisias and the west bay was named Limni Etheros. Modern popular names are Cleopatra's bay for the east bay and Pirates' bay for the west bay. Both bays are popular beaches and in fact the cape is named after a site of marine resorts just north of the isthmus. However owing to dominant lodos winds of the Mediterranean coast, the Pirates' bay is not as sheltered as the Cleopatra's bay.

References

Tisan
Landforms of Mersin Province
Silifke District